Wannukandi Airport  is an airport serving Wannukandi, in the Guna Yala comarca (indigenous province) of Panama. The runway is on the Caribbean coast, and north approach and departures are over the water.

See also

Transport in Panama
List of airports in Panama

References

External links
 OpenStreetMap - Wannukandi
 

Airports in Panama
Guna Yala